Kırcasalih is a belde (town) in Uzunköprü district of Edirne Province, Turkey,  It is situated in the eastern Trakya (Thrace) plains at . The population of the Kırcasalih was 3157  as of 2013. The village was founded in the 14th century just after the early Turkish settlement in Trakya began. The earliest name of the town was Karacasalih. However, in the 18th century the government settled Greeks and Christian Albanians in the town after an attempted rebellion. Most Turks left the town, and the town was renamed Zalof. The newcomers excelled in viticulture. But during the compulsory population exchange between Greece and Turkey in 1920s, the Greek population was replaced with Pomaks and Turks from Greece and North Macedonia.

References

Towns in Turkey
Populated places in Uzunköprü District